Belfast West is a parliamentary constituency (seat) in the House of Commons of the UK Parliament. The current MP is Paul Maskey of Sinn Féin.

In 2017, it ranked the most secure of Northern Ireland's 18 seats by percentage and/or numerical tally of its winning majority, followed by North Down and by North Antrim respectively.

Boundaries

1885–1918: In the Borough of Belfast, Smithfield ward, that part of St. Anne's ward bounded on the north-west by a line drawn along the centre of Carrick Hill, that part of St. George's ward lying to the north of a line drawn along the centre of Grosvenor Street and west of a line drawn along the centre of Durham Street, and the townlands of Ballymagarry and Ballymurphy in the parish of Shankill.

1922–1974: The County Borough of Belfast wards of Court, Falls, St. Anne's, St. George's, Smithfield, and Woodvale. The boundaries of these wards can be seen in Schedule 9 of the Report of the Boundary Commission (Ireland) on the Representation of the People Bill 1917 - redistribution of seats.

1974–1983: The County Borough of Belfast wards of Court, Falls, St Anne's, St George's, Smithfield, and Woodvale, and the Rural District of Lisburn electoral divisions of Andersonstown, Ballygammon, and Ladybrook.

1983–1997: The District of Belfast wards of Andersonstown, Ballygomartin, Central, Clonard, Court, Falls, Grosvenor, Highfield, Ladybrook, Milltown, North Howard, St James, Suffolk, and Whiterock.

1997–2010: The District of Belfast wards of Andersonstown, Beechmount, Clonard, Falls, Falls Park, Glencairn, Glencolin, Glen Road, Highfield, Ladybrook, Shankill, Upper Springfield, and Whiterock, and the District of Lisburn wards of Collin Glen, Kilwee, Poleglass, and Twinbrook.

2010–present: The District of Belfast wards of Andersonstown, Beechmount, Clonard, Falls, Falls Park, Glencairn, Glencolin, Glen Road, Highfield, Ladybrook, Shankill, Upper Springfield, and Whiterock, and the City of Lisburn wards of Collin Glen, Dunmurry, Kilwee, Poleglass, Twinbrook, and part of Derryaghy.

The seat was restored in 1922 (having been abolished for the 1918 general election) when as part of the establishment of the devolved Stormont Parliament for Northern Ireland, the number of MPs in the Westminster Parliament was drastically cut. In 1983 the Sandy Row and Donegall Road areas were removed leaving a seat centred on the west section of Belfast, though between 1983 and 1997 it included the area around the Docks on the north east side of the Lagan Estuary.

Prior to the 2010 general election, boundary changes added the Dunmurry ward and the northern part of Derriaghy ward to this seat. Following public consultation, the proposals were passed through Parliament via the Northern Ireland Parliamentary Constituencies Order. In an unprecedented move by a Boundary Commission, an electoral ward was split between constituencies following disquiet in parts of Derriaghy. This ward is now split between Belfast West and Lagan Valley.

History 

Belfast West has historically been the most nationalist of Belfast's four constituencies, though it is only in the last few decades that the votes for unionist parties have plunged to tiny levels. The constituency is largely made of a long, slender, belt along the Falls Road and its suburban extensions, with three of the five wards from the staunchly unionist Shankill area now something of a bolt-on, with a several kilometre long peace line dividing them from the rest of the constituency. There is also a smaller Protestant enclave at Suffolk.

The tenor of the constituency is largely working class and in the 1991 census it was one of only twenty constituencies where the majority of housing was still state owned. Although there are now large pockets of middle-class housing in Andersonstown and other suburban parts of the seat. Closer to the centre public-sector terraced housing, both Victorian and high quality modern housing, predominates, while in the suburbs, leafy pockets are scattered among post-War housing estates such as Lenadoon and Twinbrook.

The Westminster constituency was consistently held by the Ulster Unionist Party but always had strong Labour movement sympathies. In the 1923 UK general election, the Belfast Labour Party came within 1,000 votes of taking the seat. A by-election in 1943 was won by Jack Beattie, standing for the Northern Ireland Labour Party. For the next twenty-three years the seat would regularly change from unionist to nationalist/labour, with the latter represented by a variety of parties.

In the 1966 general election the seat was won by Gerry Fitt of the Republican Labour Party. Later in 1970 he left that party to become a founder and first leader of the Social Democratic and Labour Party. In the February 1974 general election, Belfast West was the only constituency in Northern Ireland to elect an MP supporting the Sunningdale Agreement. Fitt's majority was a narrow 2180 votes in February 1974 primarily due to the candidature of Albert Price, father of the Price sisters who were in prison in England for PIRA related offences. However the candidacy of a UVF backed candidate in October 1974 and a declining Unionist vote in 1979 led to him increasing his majorities in subsequent years. He retained the seat for the next nine years but increasingly distanced himself from nationalist groups and in late 1979 he left the SDLP altogether. He sat as an independent socialist but lost his seat in the 1983 General Election when it was won by Gerry Adams of Sinn Féin. The Unionist vote which had still been at 30% in the 1982 Assembly elections was cut to 20% as a result of the 1983 boundary changes which, while adding the loyalist Glencairn area, removed the Donegall Road, Sandy Row and added the Nationalist Lenadoon area.

Adams' share of the vote, at 37%, was short of a majority and he achieved victory only due to Fitt and the SDLP candidate splitting the non-Sinn Féin vote. In 1987 Adams narrowly held his seat, but lost it in the 1992 general election amidst a strong tactical voting campaign in favour of Joe Hendron of the Social Democratic and Labour Party by unionists in the Shankill Road area of the constituency. After the election a constituent, Maura McCrory, lodged an election petition challenging the result. The election court reported Hendron personally guilty of the illegal practice of failing to deliver a declaration verifying the return of his election expenses, and guilty through his election agent of failing to deliver a verified return of election expenses within 35 days, exceeding the maximum spending by £782.02, and failing to pay all the expenses within 28 days. Hendron's agent was also reported personally guilty of distributing election material without the name and address of the printer and publisher. The Judges granted both Hendron and his agent relief from their findings, on the grounds that the law had been broken through inadvertence; they therefore certified that Hendron had been duly elected.

In the mid-1990s the Boundary Commission originally suggested removing the Shankill wards from the constituency and replacing them with about half of the Belfast South constituency namely the 6 wards of the Balmoral Electoral Area and the Shaftesbury ward, effectively transforming the seat into a Belfast South West constituency.

The subsequent local enquiries were bitterly contested with the SDLP favouring the commission's original proposals which would add an area where Sinn Féin had little support (and aside from the Shaftesbury ward, had not contested in council elections), while Sinn Féin argued instead for adding the mostly republican Twinbrook and Poleglass estates (where they were outpolling the SDLP in council elections by a margin of 3 to 1). With all parties except the SDLP supporting an option of retaining four seats in Belfast the latter option became the commissions final proposals and the Shankill wards remained in the constituency.

The boundary changes, coupled with the IRA ceasefire, meant that support for Sinn Féin in the constituency soared to new levels and in all elections held in the seat since 1996 they have taken over 50% of the vote. In 1997 Adams regained the seat and held it in 2001, 2005 and 2010. In 2011, Adams decided to stand in the 2011 Republic of Ireland general election and vacated his seat.

In the 2016 referendum to leave the European Union, the constituency voted remain by 74.1%.

Members of Parliament 

The Member of Parliament since a 2011 by-election is Paul Maskey of Sinn Féin, who succeeded Gerry Adams, the party president. Adams previously held the seat from 1983 to 1992 when he lost it to Joe Hendron of the Social Democratic and Labour Party but regained it in 1997.

In November 2010, Adams announced his intention to contest the imminent election in the Republic of Ireland. Although the Disqualifications Act 2000 permits MPs to sit in Dáil Éireann, he submitted a letter of resignation to the Speaker in January 2011. However, the prescribed procedure for vacating a parliamentary seat involves applying for the post of Crown Steward and Bailiff of the Manor of Northstead, which he had "no intention" of doing. Thus he was still considered to hold the seat. On 26 January, HM Treasury announced that Adams had been appointed as Steward and Bailiff of the Manor of Northstead. The Prime Minister, David Cameron, claimed that Adams had applied for the appointment, but this was later clarified to state that he had not requested the appointment. Adams stated the Prime Minister's private secretary had apologised to him for making the announcement that Adams had 'accepted' the position, when in fact Adams' resignation letter was taken to be a request to be so appointed, whatever his own wishes.

Election results

Elections in the 2010s

This seat had the largest Sinn Féin vote share at the 2019 general election. It also saw the only increase in vote share for the DUP at the election.

Elections in the 2000s

Elections in the 1990s

1997 Changes are compared to the 1992 notional results shown below.

Elections in the 1980s

Following the 1979 election, Fitt became increasingly at odds with the SDLP and left it, continuing to sit as an independent socialist.

Elections in the 1970s

After the 1970 election Fitt left the Republican Labour Party to cofound the Social Democratic & Labour Party. The remains of Republican Labour had disintegrated by 1974.

Elections in the 1960s

Elections in the 1950s

Elections in the 1940s

Elections in the 1930s

Note: The sitting MP, W.E.D. Allen, had joined the New Party earlier in 1931 but did not contest the seat at the general election.

Elections in the 1920s

Elections in the 1910s

Elections in the 1900s

Elections in the 1890s

Elections in the 1880s

See also 
 List of parliamentary constituencies in Northern Ireland

References

Further reading
F. W. S. Craig, British Parliamentary Election Results 1918 – 1949
F. W. S. Craig, British Parliamentary Election Results 1950 – 1970
The Liberal Year Book For 1917, Liberal Publication Department
The Constitutional Year Book For 1912, Conservative Central Office
The Constitutional Year Book For 1894, Conservative Central Office

External links 
Politics Resources (Election results from 1922 onwards)
Electoral Calculus (Election results from 1955 onwards)
2017 Election House of Commons Library 2017 Election report
A Vision Of Britain Through Time (Constituency elector numbers)
Guardian Unlimited Politics (Election results from 1992 to the present)
Election results from 1951 to the present , at psr.keele.ac.uk
 (Complete list of MPs)

Westminster Parliamentary constituencies in Belfast
Westminster Parliamentary constituencies in Northern Ireland
Constituencies of the Parliament of the United Kingdom established in 1885
Constituencies of the Parliament of the United Kingdom disestablished in 1918
Constituencies of the Parliament of the United Kingdom established in 1922